UST or Ust may refer to:

Organizations
 UST (company), American digital technology company
 Equatorial Guinea Workers' Union
 Union of Trade Unions of Chad (Union des Syndicats du Tchad)
 United States Television Manufacturing Corp.
 UST Growling Tigers, men's varsity team
 UST Inc., tobacco company

Universities
 University of Science and Technology (disambiguation)
 Hong Kong University of Science and Technology (HKUST)
 University of Science and Technology (South Korea)
 University of Santo Tomas in Manila, Philippines 
 University of St. Thomas (Minnesota)
 University of St. Thomas (Texas) in Houston, US

Places
 Northeast Florida Regional Airport, St. Augustine, US, IATA Code
 Oskemen, Kazakhstan: Ust-Kamenogorsk in Russian
 Qala Wust or Ūst, Badakhshan Province, Afghanistan

Other uses
 Universal System Tubeless, a tubeless tire rim patented by Mavic
 Underground storage tank
 United States Treasury security, a bond issued by the federal government
 Unsepttrium, an unsynthesized chemical element
 .ust, file extension for Utau project files
 Ultimate Success Today, 2020 Protomartyr album
 TerraUSD (by ticker symbol), a stablecoin cryptocurrency developed by Do Kwon